Lakshmi Narain College of Technology (LNCT), Jabalpur is an institute located in the historic and industrial city of Jabalpur, Madhya Pradesh, India. The institute was established in 2008, offering courses in engineering and management.

The institute is run by the Lakshmi Narain Group of Institutions, which is credited with the establishment of the first private engineering institution in the state of Madhya Pradesh with LNCT Bhopal. The group derives its name from the Hindu deities, Lakshmi Narayan. It owns and runs a university, schools, colleges, hospitals and 24 other educational and research institutions with courses in engineering, technology, management, medicine, dentistry,  ayurveda, homeopathy, pharmacy, nursing, paramedical science, library science, hotel management, law, architecture, town planning, design, commerce, economics, journalism, mass communication and applied sciences at diploma, bachelor's, master's and doctoral levels, in five cities of Madhya Pradesh and Chhattisgarh.

LNCT Jabalpur is located on the NH-12 Jabalpur-Bhopal National Highway, just 2 km away from the Bhedaghat Railway Station, near the banks of the Narmada River ("the Lifeline of Madhya Pradesh") in close vicinity of the world-famous tourist sights, Marble Rocks, Chausath Yogini Temple and Dhuandhar Falls. It offers diploma, bachelor's and master's degree courses in engineering, technology and management. It is approved by the All India Council for Technical Education, New Delhi, and recognised by the Directorate of Technical Education, Madhya Pradesh. It is affiliated to RGPV Bhopal, which is the State Technological University of Madhya Pradesh, for its engineering courses, and to RDVV Jabalpur, also known as the University of Jabalpur, for its management courses.

Academics 
LNCT Jabalpur offers diploma, bachelor's: Bachelor of Engineering (B.E.), and master's: Master of Technology (M.Tech.) and Master of Business Administration (MBA) degree courses in engineering, technology and management. Diploma courses are of three years duration, bachelor's are of four years duration and master's degree programmes are of two-year duration. The institute follows semester system for all its courses. The courses are full-time in nature and the student is expected to maintain at least 75% attendance during each semester. The courses offered are as follows:

Department of Civil Engineering
 Diploma in Civil Engineering 
 Bachelor's degree (B.E.) in Civil Engineering

Department of Mechanical Engineering
 Diploma in Mechanical Engineering 
 Bachelor's degree (B.E.) in Mechanical Engineering

Department of Electrical & Electronics Engineering
 Diploma in Electrical & Electronics Engineering 
 Bachelor's degree (B.E.) in Electrical & Electronics Engineering

Department of Electronics & Communications Engineering
 Bachelor's degree (B.E.) in Electronics & Communications Engineering
 Master's degree (M.Tech.) in Digital Electronics

Department of Computer Science & Engineering
 Bachelor's degree (B.E.) in Computer Science & Engineering
 Master's degree (M.Tech.) in Computer Science & Engineering

Department of Mining & Mineral Processing
 Bachelor's degree (B.E.) in Mining & Mineral Processing

Department of Management Studies
 Master's degree in Business Administration (MBA)

In addition to the above departments that award diplomas and/or academic degrees to students upon successful completion of their respective courses, there are other teaching departments as well, such as the departments of Humanities, Physics, Chemistry and Mathematics. All the courses are supported by the Central Workshop, Central Library, Central Computing Facility and the Training & Placement Cell.

New Departments and Courses 
LNCT Jabalpur is on its way to establish new departments and introduce new courses as follows:

Department of Architecture & Town Planning
 Bachelor's degree in architecture (B.Arch)
 Master's degree in Urban Planning (MUP)

Department of Design
 Bachelor's degree in design (B.Des)
 Master's degree in design (M.Des)

Department of Pharmacy
 Bachelor's degree in pharmacy (B.Pharm.)
 Master's degree in pharmacy (M.Pharm.)

Other activities
NCC

The LNCT University has signed an MOU with NCC to connect the young generation with education as well as serving the nation in conformity with the "National Education Policy" (NEP) of India.

References

External links 
 LNCT Jabalpur website

2008 establishments in Madhya Pradesh
Educational institutions established in 2008
Colleges in India
Engineering colleges in Madhya Pradesh
Education in Jabalpur